The 2018–19 season of Kabuscorp Sport Clube do Palanca is the club's 17th season in Angolan football and the 12th consecutive season in the Girabola, the top flight league of Angolan football. In 2018–19,  the club participated in the Girabola and the Angola Cup.

FAF Penalty
Kabuscorp forfeited 9 points, for failing to address payment claims by a total 6 individuals, following a 15-day deadline stipulated by the Angolan Football Federation (FAF). The first case includes former player Adawá Mokanga, the second case includes former staff members Afonso Paxe Filho, Dombasi João, Kutama Shabani and former head-coach Romeu Filemón whereas the third case refers to former club physician Dr. Caetano Maria.

FIFA penalty
The Angolan Football Federation received a letter from FIFA ordering Kabuscorp to be relegated for failing to meet payment claims by former player Rivaldo. Even though the debt has reportedly been paid in full, Kabuscorp failed to pay within the established deadline. The club faced a second relegation penalty regarding their dispute with TP Mazembe

Squad information

Players

Pre-season transfers

Mid-season transfers

Staff

Overview

Angolan League

League table

Results

Results summary

Results by round

Results overview

Match details

Angola Cup

Round of 16

Quarter finals

Season statistics

Appearances and goals

|-
! colspan="10" style="background:#DCDCDC; text-align:center" | Goalkeepers

|-
! colspan="13" style="background:#DCDCDC; text-align:center" | Defenders

|-
! colspan="13" style="background:#DCDCDC; text-align:center" | Midfielders

|-
! colspan="13" style="background:#DCDCDC; text-align:center" | Forwards

|-
! colspan=13 style=background:#DCDCDC; text-align:center| Players transferred out during the season

|-
! colspan="10" style="background:#DCDCDC; text-align:center" | Total

Scorers

Clean sheets

Season progress

See also
 List of Kabuscorp S.C.P. players

External links
 Match schedule
 Girabola.com profile
 Zerozero.pt profile
 Soccerway profile
 Facebook profile

References

Kabuscorp S.C.P. seasons
Kabuscorp